Pyramidobela compulsa is a moth in the family Oecophoridae. It is found in southern Chile.

The ground color of the forewings is whitish ocherous irregularly suffused with brownish. The ground color of the hindwings is gray-whitish. Adults have been recorded in December.

References

Moths described in 1931
Oecophoridae
Endemic fauna of Chile